The River Slaney is a large river in the southeast of Ireland. It rises on Lugnaquilla Mountain in the western Wicklow Mountains and flows west and then south through counties Wicklow, Carlow and Wexford for 117.5 km (73 mi), before entering St George's Channel in the Irish Sea at Wexford town. The estuary of the Slaney is wide and shallow and is known as Wexford Harbour. The catchment area of the River Slaney is 1,762 km2.
The long term average flow rate of the River Slaney is 37.4m3/s

Towns that the Slaney runs through include Stratford-on-Slaney, Baltinglass, Tullow, Bunclody, Enniscorthy and Wexford. The river is crossed by 32 road bridges and one railway bridge.

Wildlife
Varied and plentiful wildlife can be found in the environs of the river. In Wicklow, herds of deer can be seen, as well as swans, dippers, wild ducks, herons and kingfishers. At dusk, bats, owls and otters may be seen, while the mudflats of the estuary are favoured by black-headed gulls, redshanks and oystercatchers. The rare goosander can be seen on the Slaney at Kildavin. In season, salmon and trout and pike are fished.

History
Ptolemy's Geography (2nd century AD) described a river called Μοδοννος (Modonnos, "mudflats") which may have referred to the River Slaney, though scholarly opinion remains divided on the issue.

There is a reference to the Slaney in the Irish ballad Boolavogue, commemorating the Battle of Vinegar Hill in the Irish Rebellion of 1798.

Tributaries
Tributaries of the Slaney include the River Derreen, the River Derry, the River Clody, the River Bann, the River Urrin, the River Boro, and the River Sow.

Rivers of Ireland

References

External links

 River Slaney: Environment Under Threat

Rivers of County Wicklow
Rivers of County Carlow
Rivers of County Wexford
Wexford, County Wexford